Yuri Alexandrovich Sklyarov (8 February 1925, Kursk - 3 August 2013) was a Soviet politician, Candidate of Historical Sciences, a CPSU member since 1944, a candidate member of the Central Committee (1981-1989), Deputy of the Supreme Soviet of the USSR 11 convocation. From July 1986 to November 1988, he was the head of the Propaganda Department of the Central Committee of the CPSU.

References 

1925 births
2013 deaths
Politicians from Kursk
Central Committee of the Communist Party of the Soviet Union candidate members
Eleventh convocation members of the Supreme Soviet of the Soviet Union
National University of Kharkiv alumni
Recipients of the Order of Lenin
Recipients of the Order of the Red Banner
Burials in Troyekurovskoye Cemetery
Head of Propaganda Department of CPSU CC